The Polikarpov I-185 was a Soviet fighter aircraft designed in 1940. It was flown with three engines but all of them were either insufficiently developed for service use or their full production was reserved for other fighters already in production. The I-185 program was cancelled on 27 January 1943.

Design and development
The I-185, designed in early 1940, was based on the I-180, which was itself a development of the I-16, but was virtually a new design. The monocoque fuselage was similarly built of 'shpon', molded birch plywood, and also had an integral fin, but it was considerably longer than that of the I-180. The two-spar, all-metal wing was smaller and thinner than the I-180's wing, nearly as thin as that of the Supermarine Spitfire's wing at 13% at the root and tapered to 8% at the wing tip. The wing had a NACA-230 profile and was skinned in duralumin. Pneumatically powered split flaps and leading edge slats were fitted. The outer wing panels had 3° of dihedral. The fabric-covered control surfaces were framed in duralumin. The protected  fuel tanks were mounted between the wing center section spars. The I-185 used a conventional undercarriage with a retractable tailwheel. The unproven 1,492 kW (2,000 hp) 18-cylinder, two-row Tumansky M-90 radial engine was carried on welded steel tubes. It was fitted with a ducted spinner to improve cooling with the air expelled through gills as in the I-180 to provide additional thrust. The synchronized armament was mounted in the fuselage, two  ShKAS machine guns and two  Berezin UBS machine guns. A  bomb could be carried under overload conditions. The first prototype was completed in May 1940, but the only available example of the M-90 did not provide enough power for take-off. The prototype was modified to use another experimental engine, the  Shvetsov M-81 radial, but this was not nearly powerful enough for flight tests. The I-185 (M-81) finally took to the air on January 11, 1941, but it was decided not to waste further development and await a more powerful engine which was fortunate as the M-81 was cancelled in May 1941.

A second prototype was completed at the end of 1940 with a 14-cylinder, 1,268 kW (1,700 hp) Shvetsov M-82A radial engine. The forward fuselage had to be redesigned to accommodate the slimmer engine and the armament was revised to three synchronized  ShVAK cannon. The drawings for this engine installation was passed to Lavochkin and Yakovlev where they proved very useful in designing their own fighters using the M-82 engine, notably the Lavochkin La-5. A third prototype was also built that used the larger and heavier Shvetsov M-71 radial engine of 1,492 kW (2,000 hp). The flight tests of both of the latter versions were interrupted by the German invasion in June 1941 and all three prototypes, along with the entire Polikarpov design bureau, were evacuated to Novosibirsk.

It was recommended for immediate production, even before it began combat trials in November 1942. All three aircraft were assigned to the 728th Fighter Aviation Regiment of the 3rd Air Army of the Kalinin Front and were tightly controlled to prevent the loss of the prototypes. For example, all sorties had to be flown over Soviet-controlled territory and required the express permission of the 3rd Air Army staff to fly. Pilots' reports were quite enthusiastic; the 728th's commander, Captain Vasilyaka wrote: "The I-185 outclasses both Soviet and foreign aircraft in level speed. It performs aerobatic maneuvers easily, rapidly and vigorously. The I-185 is the best current fighter from the point of control simplicity, speed, maneuverability (especially in climb), armament and survivability."

Based on the glowing report by the NII VVS (Nauchno-Issledovatel'skiy Institut Voyenno-Vozdushnykh Sil—Air Force Scientific Test Institute) in early 1942 preparations began to put the I-185 (M-71) into production. A 'production standard setter (etalon)' aircraft was built in April 1942 with a redesigned engine cowling. It underwent manufacturer's tests between June and October and was submitted for the State acceptance tests on 18 November. However, flight testing was interrupted by the need to replace the engine between 17 December 1942 and 26 January 1943. The new engine failed the next day and the aircraft crashed on 27 January. Flight tests were ordered to be continued with the original prototypes to validate the range figures, but the first prototype crashed on 5 April, killing the pilot as he attempted a dead-stick landing.

All work to put the I-185 into production was cancelled afterwards, even with the M-82 engine, as they were all required for the La-5 fighter. Another reason cited was that the La-5 used the fuselage of the Lavochkin-Gorbunov-Goudkov LaGG-3 which was already in production in three plants and would involve less disruption of the production lines. Another factor may have been that the La-5 required less duralumin to build, something in short supply at the time.

Variants
Polikarpov began preliminary design of two updated versions of the I-185 design in February 1943. The I-187 had a M-71F engine of 1,640 kW (2,200 hp), a bubble canopy, four 20 mm cannons, eight RS-82 rockets and an estimated maximum speed of 710 km/h (441 mph). The I-188 used an improved M-90 engine with 1,552 kW (2,080 hp) and used the same armament as the I-187, although the fuselage was slimmer than that of the I-187 because of the slimmer engine.

Specifications (I-185 (M-71 etalon))

See also

References

Notes

Bibliography

 Abanshin, Michael E. and Gut, Nina. Fighting Polikarpov, Eagles of the East No. 2. Lynnwood, WA: Aviation International, 1994. .
 Gordon, Yefim and Dexter, Keith. Polikarpov's Biplane Fighters (Red Star, vol. 6). Earl Shilton, Leicester, UK: Midland Publishing, 2002. 
 Green, William and Swanborough, Gordon. The Complete Book of Fighters. New York: Smithmark Publishers, 1994. .
 Gordon, Yefim. Soviet Airpower in World War 2. Hinckley, England: Midland Publishing, 2008 
 Guglya, Yu. A. and Ivanov, V.P. (Гугля, Ю.А., Иванов, В.П.) "Rokovoi I-180" ("Роковой И-180") ("The Fatal I-180") . Aerohobbi nr.1/94, 1994.
 Gunston, Bill. The Osprey Encyclopaedia of Russian Aircraft 1875–1995. London, Osprey, 1995 
 Kopenhagen, W. (ed.) Das große Flugzeug-Typenbuch. Transpress, 1987. .
 Léonard, Herbert. Les avions de chasse Polikarpov. Rennes, France: Éditions Ouest-France, 1981. . (French)
 Léonard, Herbert. Les chasseurs Polikarpov. Clichy, France: Éditions Larivière, 2004. . (French)
 Maslov, Mikhail (Маслов, Михаил). И-180 / И-185 (I-180/I-185) . Moscow: Tekhnika-molodezhi; Vostochnyi gorizont, 2003. 

1940s Soviet fighter aircraft
World War II Soviet fighter aircraft
I-185
Single-engined tractor aircraft
Aircraft first flown in 1941